Peter Richard Killeen (born 1942) is an American psychologist who has made major contributions to a number of fields in the behavioral sciences. He has been one of the few premier contributors in quantitative analysis of behavior, and memory.

Life and work
In 1942, he was born in Orange, New Jersey. In 1964, he received his bachelor's degree in psychology in the honors college from Michigan State University and in 1969, his Ph.D. in Experimental Psychology from Harvard University. He joined the faculty of Arizona State University and in 1978 rose to the rank of Professor of Psychology. He has been a visiting scholar, University of Texas, Austin 1984, Cambridge University in 1992, Centre for Advanced Study, Oslo, 2004

His honors include: Woodrow Wilson, NSF, and NIMH Graduate Fellowships, Graduate Student Faculty of the Year Award, Fellow of: American Psychological Association, American Psychological Society, Association for Behavior Analysis; Member, Psychonomic Society; Sigma Xi (President, ASU Chapter, 1986 – 87), Wakonse (teaching) Fellow, 1993, Fellow, Society of Experimental Psychologists (1997; Secretary/Treasurer 2000 – 3), Senior Scientist Award (1996; NIMH), President, Society for Quantitative Analysis of Behavior (1999 – 2002); Poetry in Science Award, SQAB, 2002, F. J. McGuigan Lectureship on Understanding the Human Mind (APA: 2004), Ernest and Josephine Hilgard Award for the Best Theoretical Paper (Killeen & Nash, 2003), Faculty of 1000 Citation as Must Read: Russell et al. (2006) Response variability in AD/HD.

In quantitative analysis of behavior, Killeen and Fetterman (1988) are the developers of a major behavioral theory of timing. Killeen has also developed a theory of learning as causal inference (1981) bringing these together in his paper on the perception of contingency in conditioning: Scalar timing, response bias, and the erasure of memory by reinforcement (Killeen, 1984). He also developed his Incentive theory based on adaptive clocks. He is one of the premier integrators and critics of models in quantitative analysis of behavior.

In the study of memory (Killeen, 2005; 2006) addressed the issue of ascending strength gradients or descending memory traces.

References
 Killeen, P. R. Learning as causal inference. (1981). In M. L. Commons & J. A. Nevin (Eds.), Quantitative studies of behavior. New York: Pergamon, pp. 289–312.
 Killeen, P. R. (1984). Incentive theory III: Adaptive Clocks. In J. Gibbon & L. Allen (Eds.), Timing and time perception. Annals of the New York Academy of Sciences, pp. 515–527.
 Killeen, P. R. (2005). An alternative to null hypothesis statistical tests. Psychological Science, 16, 345–353.
 Killeen, P. R. (2006). Beyond statistical inference: A decision theory for science. Psychonomic Bulletin & Review, 13, 549–562.
 Killeen, P. R., & Fetterman, J. G. (1988). A behavioral theory of timing. Psychological Review, 95, 274–295.
 Killeen, P. R., & Smith, J. P. (1984). Perception of contingency in conditioning: Scalar timing, response bias, and the erasure of memory by reinforcement. Journal of Experimental Psychology: Animal Behavior Processes, 10, 333–345.

1942 births
Michigan State University alumni
Harvard University alumni
Arizona State University faculty
21st-century American psychologists
Living people
20th-century American psychologists